This is a list of the highest astronomical observatories in the world, considering only ground-based observatories and ordered by elevation above mean sea level. The main list includes only permanent observatories with facilities constructed at a fixed location, followed by a supplementary list for temporary observatories such as transportable telescopes or instrument packages. For large observatories with numerous telescopes at a single location, only a single entry is included listing the main elevation of the observatory or of the highest operational instrument if that information is available.

History of high altitude astronomical observatories
Prior to the late 19th century, almost all astronomical observatories throughout history were located at modest elevations, often close to cities and educational institutions for the simple reason of convenience. As air pollution from industrialization and light pollution from artificial lighting increased during the Industrial Revolution, astronomers sought observatory sites in remote locations with clear and dark skies, naturally drawing them towards the mountains. The first permanent mountaintop astronomical observatory was the Lick Observatory constructed from 1876 to 1887, at the modest elevation of  atop Mount Hamilton in California. The first high altitude observatory was constructed atop the  Pic du Midi de Bigorre in the French Pyrenees starting in 1878, with its first telescope and dome installed in 1904. Astronomical observations were also made from Mont Blanc in the late 1800s.

A few other high altitude observatories (such as the Lowell Observatory in Arizona and Sphinx Observatory in Switzerland) were constructed through the first half of the 20th century. The stunning successes and discoveries made there using the world's largest telescopes, the 100-inch Hooker Telescope and 200-inch Hale Telescope, spurred the move to ever higher sites for the new generation of observatories and telescopes after World War II, along with a worldwide search for locations which had the best astronomical seeing.

Since the mid-20th century, an increasing number of high altitude observatory sites have been developed at locations around the world, including numerous sites in Arizona, Hawaii, Chile, and the Canary Islands. The initial wave of high-altitude sites were mostly in the  range, but astronomers soon sought even higher sites above . Among the largest, best developed, and most renowned of these high altitude sites is the Mauna Kea Observatory located near the summit of a  volcano in Hawaii, which has grown to include over a dozen major telescopes during the four decades since it was founded. In the first decade of the 21st century, there has been a new wave of observatory construction at very high altitudes above , with such observatories constructed in India, Mexico, and most notably the Atacama Desert in northern Chile, now the site of several of the world's highest observatories. The scientific benefits of these sites outweigh the numerous logistical and physiological challenges which must be overcome during the construction and operation of observatories in remote mountain locations, even in desert, polar, and tropical island sites which magnify the challenges but confer additional observational advantages.

Sites at high altitude are ideal for optical astronomy and provide optimal seeing, being above a significant portion of the Earth's atmosphere with its associated weather, turbulence, and diminished clarity. High altitude sites are also above most of atmosphere's water vapor, making them ideal for infrared astronomy and submillimeter astronomy as those wavelengths are strongly absorbed by water vapor. On the other hand, high altitude does not offer as significant an advantage for radio astronomy at longer wavelengths, so relatively few radio telescopes are located at such sites. At the far end of the spectrum, for the extremely short wavelengths of x-ray and gamma ray astronomy, along with high-energy cosmic rays, high altitude observations once again offers significant advantages, enough that many experiments at these wavelengths have been conducted by balloon-borne or even by space telescopes, although a number of high-altitude ground-based sites have also been used.

Highest permanent observatories 
Permanent observatories above 3,000 m:

Highest temporary observatories 

Temporary observatories above 3,000 m:

Other important high altitude observatories 

This is a selected list of the most important and notable high altitude observatories between 1700 and 3000 m; it is not intended to list all of the numerous observatories worldwide in this elevation range:

See also 
 List of telescope types
 Lists of telescopes
 List of astronomical observatories
 Observational astronomy

References 

Note: References for most elevations can be found in the linked main article for each observatory.

 Citations

 Bibliography

 
 
 

Astronomical observatories